Satrangi Peengh 2 is the studio album by Harbhajan Mann & Gursewak Mann released on 27 December 2012.

Track listing
All music composed by Jaidev Kumar and lyrics was given by Babu Singh Maan.

Awards

PTC  Punjabi Music Awards 2013

 Won - Best Folk Pop Album

References 

2012 albums